Spencer is the debut solo album and fourteenth studio album release overall by Spencer Albee. The album was announced in the summer of 2012 with a PledgeMusic campaign, and the track listing was announced on June 19, 2013. The album was released on July 9, 2013.

Track listing
"It's Alive" - 3:55
"Lucky" - 5:14
"Macworth" - 3:16
"California's Calling" - 3:45
"Lost My Way" - 4:46
"Wait Through the War" - 4:27
"Sundown" - 3:45
"Nobody to Blame" - 3:18
"When Will I Die?" - 3:26
"Kiss Me Like a Stranger" - 3:20

Release 
Albee released previews for the songs in February 2013 and mixing was underway by May. After almost two decades as a lauded Portland, Maine musician, Spencer marked his solo debut.

References

2013 debut albums
Spencer Albee albums